Donna Wick (born April 14, 1956) is an American author, talk radio host, inspirational speaker, publisher and media expert.

Biography
Donna Wick was born in Texas City, Texas, the middle child of three daughters. She began her speaking career in the first grade while attending Our Lady of Fatima Catholic School leading school friends on weekend excursions to "find God" in the alley ways of Texas City. Later in life, Wick developed a national lecture inspirational series called "Awaken the God Within" and infomercial producers Kent & Spiegel produced and infomercial program landing Wick on national radio. Wick was a nationally syndicated talk radio host with a broadcast called "Vision for America" for six years beginning 1996. She also featured a broadcast called "Donna Wick Live! Intelligent Radio for Women" weekday evenings with Talk America.

She has been a featured Mind, Body, Spirit expert on NBC's TalkCity and Tony Robbins' Dreamlife.com. Donna has also been featured in New York Times best-seller, “Chicken Soup for the Woman's Soul” and written for Belief.net and SpiritualityToday.com. She has also written for American Media, publishers of pocket publications and the STAR tabloid magazine.

Books
Wick has been published in numerous magazines and newspapers and has been featured in Chicken Soup for the Woman's Soul. She authored three books of her own: The Day God Smiled, Avina Publishing 2000,(), Meditations at The Speed of Life, Avina Publishing 2000,(), and The "I Am" Messages, Avina Publishing 2000,().

References

Nonprofit groups get New Vision helping communities by Sharon Spoonemore (2010-05-11), The Woodlands Villager Newspaper, www.hcnonline.com.
 Talk of The Woodlands, (May 2010), https://web.archive.org/web/20110201100307/http://www.talkofthewoodlands.com/.
Donna Wick, PR "dwPR" www.donnawickpr.com

External links
 [www.donnawickpr.com Official Company Site]
 [www.newvisioncommunicationsgroup.com]

Living people
1956 births
American talk radio hosts
American women radio presenters
People from Texas City, Texas
American motivational speakers
Women motivational speakers